Oleg Panyutin (born 10 May 1983, in Baku, Azerbaijan SSR) is a Paralympian athlete from Azerbaijan competing mainly in category F12 long jump events.

Oleg competed in the 2004 Summer Paralympics in the T12 100 and 200 metres and won the F12 long jump gold medal.  In 2008 he attempted to defend his title but only managed third in the F12 long jump winning the bronze medal.

References

External links
 

1983 births
Living people
Azerbaijani male sprinters
Azerbaijani male long jumpers
Azerbaijani male triple jumpers
Paralympic athletes of Azerbaijan
Athletes (track and field) at the 2004 Summer Paralympics
Athletes (track and field) at the 2008 Summer Paralympics
Athletes (track and field) at the 2012 Summer Paralympics
Paralympic gold medalists for Azerbaijan
Paralympic bronze medalists for Azerbaijan
Paralympic medalists in athletics (track and field)
Medalists at the 2004 Summer Paralympics
Medalists at the 2008 Summer Paralympics
Medalists at the 2012 Summer Paralympics
Medalists at the World Para Athletics Championships
Medalists at the World Para Athletics European Championships
Paralympic sprinters
Paralympic long jumpers
Paralympic triple jumpers
Visually impaired sprinters
Visually impaired long jumpers
Visually impaired triple jumpers